Philippa Cross (born 7 July 1966) is a British rower. She competed at the 1992 Summer Olympics and the 1996 Summer Olympics. Cross also represented Durham University Women's Boat Club.

References

External links
 

1966 births
Living people
British female rowers
Durham University Boat Club rowers
Olympic rowers of Great Britain
Rowers at the 1992 Summer Olympics
Rowers at the 1996 Summer Olympics
Sportspeople from Banbury